Prince Moncrieffe is an English retired footballer.

Career

In 1997, Moncrieffe signed for Doncaster Rovers in the Football League Third Division. Despite Doncaster losing 34 league games, the most for any English club in a season, he wound up as the team's top scorer with ten league goals. During the season, he is claimed to have played a game in a bobble hat.

References

External links
 Prince Moncrieffe at Soccer Base

Year of birth missing (living people)
Living people
Association football forwards
English footballers
Doncaster Rovers F.C. players